Moosbierbaum is part of the municipality (commune) of Atzenbrugg in the Lower Austria.

History
In 1913, the Škoda Wetzlar gunpowder factory was established in Moosbierbaum as a subsidiary of IG Farben AG. As a target of the Oil Campaign of World War II, Moosbierbaum had a chemical works which performed 60,000 tons/year of Naphtha dehydrogenation, and an adjacent refinery for the oil from Zistersdorf.

The only surviving structure of the chemical plant is the administration building, which now serves as a hotel and restaurant for the adjacent golf-course.

Singer contralto Hilde Rössel-Majdan was a native of Moosbierbaum.

References

Cities and towns in Tulln District
Cadastral community of Tulln District
Oil campaign of World War II